This is a chronological list of Suske en Wiske albums, known in English as Spike and Suzy. The dates refer to the dates the albums first appeared in print. The first column gives the order in which the albums were originally published, and the other columns give the other series.

1. FU - Flemish uncolored series (1946-1959)

2. BS - Blue series (1952-1957)

3. DU - Dutch uncolored series (1953 - 1959)

4. FT - Flemish two-colored series (1959 - 1964)

5. DT - Dutch two-colored series (1959 - 1964)

6. JT - Joint two-colored series (1964 - 1966)

7. FC - Four-colored series (1967–present)

8. SC - Strip Classic series (1981 - 1984)

9. RC - Red Classic series (1993 - 1999)

10. PS - Pocket Series (2007–present)

Lists of mass media in Belgium
Spike and Suzy